is a railway station on the Tokyo Metro Tozai Line in Funabashi, Chiba, Japan, operated by the Tokyo subway operator Tokyo Metro. Its station number is T-22. The station opened on 29 March 1969.

Lines
 Tokyo Metro Tozai Line

Station layout
This elevated station consists of two elevated side platforms. There are also two center express tracks used for rapid trains that skip this station.

History 
Baraki-Nakayama Station opened on 29 March 1969.

The station facilities were inherited by Tokyo Metro after the privatization of the Teito Rapid Transit Authority (TRTA) in 2004.

Bus services

See also
 List of railway stations in Japan

References

External links

 Tokyo Metro station information 

Railway stations in Chiba Prefecture
Railway stations in Japan opened in 1969
Stations of Tokyo Metro
Tokyo Metro Tozai Line